Mabuhay, also known as Mabuhay Magazine, is a monthly publication that serves as the inflight magazine of Philippine Airlines. Since July 2016 the magazine has been published by London-based Ink Global.

History
Mabuhay was first published by Philippine Airlines in 1963.

In 1988, publication of the magazine passed to Eastgate Publishing Corporation, owned by Max Soliven, publisher of The Philippine Star, assuming the contract from Singaporean publishing house MPH Magazines. Eastgate had come to publish the magazine after Soliven was asked to bid for it by PAL president Dante Santos. In 2006, Soliven, writing in the Star, contemplated publishing Mabuhay as a general travel magazine that would also be available in newstands, which led to Eastgate releasing a new magazine, Mango, three years later. Eastgate continued to publish the magazine until Ink Global won the contract to publish it in 2016.

Publication of Mabuhay had been suspended owing to the COVID-19 pandemic. The first issue to be released since the pandemic began was released in November 2020, and on November 16, 2020, the magazine announced the launch of its official website.

Reception
Mabuhay has been favorably received. In 2012, under Eastgate's management, tour guide and cultural activist Carlos Celdran remarked that he loved the magazine, while businessman Andrew Marasigan, writing in the Manila Bulletin, noted that since Ink began publishing Mabuhay in 2016 there have been positive improvements in its format and content.

The magazine has won several awards, both local and international, and both for its travel photography and its journalism. In 2020, the magazine was nominated for an award by the Society of Publishers Asia for excellence in magazine design. However, it is not immune to criticism: in 2012 it was criticized for using transphobic language in its reporting of Jenna Talackova's entry in that year's Miss Universe Canada pageant — an act for which it later apologized and corrected in its digital edition.

See also
Mabuhay (expression)

References

External links

Mabuhay from Ink Global, including current issues
Archive of Eastgate Publishing-published Mabuhay issues

Philippine Airlines
Magazines published in the Philippines
Inflight magazines
Magazines established in 1963